IIC may refer to 
 Itahari International College, IT and Business college in Morang, Nepal.
 Apple IIc, a personal computer introduced by Apple Computer in April 1984
 Institute of Informatics and Communication, University of Delhi South Campus
 I²C, Inter-Integrated Circuit, a serial computer bus
 Impact insulation class, a method of determining how effective a floor structure is to footfall noise
 Independent Inquiry Committee, a UN committee commissioned with investigating alleged corruption and fraud in the Oil-for-Food Programme
 India International Centre, New Delhi, India
 Industrial Internet Consortium, founded in 2014 to further development, adoption and widespread use of interconnected machines, intelligent analytics and people at work.
 Instituto de Ingeniería del Conocimiento The Knowledge Engineering Institute (CII) is a Spanish research, development and innovation center located on the campus of Universidad Autonoma de Madrid (UAM)
 International Institute for Conservation, the global membership organisation for conservation professionals
 International Review of Intellectual Property and Competition Law, a publication in intellectual property law
 Islamic Information Center (IIC), a Washington DC based Islamic advocacy group
 Israeli Intelligence Community
 Istituto Italiano di Cultura, an Italian Cultural Institute of the Italian Ministry of Foreign Affairs

See also
 2C (disambiguation), including a list of topics named II-C, etc.